Haruka Komiyama (込山榛香 Komiyama Haruka, born September 12, 1998, in Chiba Prefecture, Japan) is a Japanese idol, singer and model. She is a member of the Japanese girl group AKB48's Team A and was an exclusive model for the Japanese teen-magazine LOVE Berry.

Career 
Komiyama passed AKB48's 15th Generation in 2013. She had her debut in May 2013 and joined the group as a Research Student (研究生 Kenkyuusei) in June 2013. In February 2014 she was promoted as an official member to Team 4 at the AKB48 Daisokaku Matsuri.

Komiyama was announced to have a documentary which first aired March 30, 2016, later airing a more complete version with footage after AKB48's General Elections. After not ranking in the group's 2014 and 2015 General Elections, she ranked at the 21st position in 2016. In October 2016, Komiyama was made an exclusive model for the Japanese teen-magazine LOVE Berry. Her first senbatsu single was High Tension released in November.

In 2017, Komiyama was announced for her second senbatsu Shoot Sign released in March. She was also announced for her third senbatsu single Negaigoto no Mochigusare as a part of the media senbatsu which was released in late May. In her 2nd General Election after ranking the prior year, Komiyama dropped 31 places to 52nd. She was also able to participate in the Kansai Collection in August.

Komiyama also participated in AKB48's wrestling event WIP Climax 2017 winning in a duo match with her partner Saya Kawamoto. In November, she was announced with 6 other members to be a part of AKB's new unit "7byou-go, Suki ni naru" (7秒後、君が好きになる。Nana byou-go, Suki ni Naru, After 7 seconds, I will like you) during a Showroom live stream where it was also revealed she was the center for their first song "Hohoemi no Toki." 

During AKB48's 12th anniversary performance, it was announced that new teams would be created in the Spring of 2018. She was transferred to Team K from Team 4 and appointed captain.

Participated as a Team K representative in the 3rd AKB48 Group Draft on January 21, 2018. 

On January 17, 2018, it was announced on AKB48's official blog that Komiyama was to perform in another AKB48 wrestling event, titled "Tofu Pro Wrestling The REAL 2018 QUEENDOM." The even is to take place on February 23, 2018, and Komiyama will fight as "Shark Komiyama" alongside SKE48's Jurina Matsui (Hollywood Jurina) against SKE48's Akari Suda (Octopus Suda) and NMB48's Miru Shiroma (Dotonbori Shiroma).

During 2018's annual AKB48 Request Hour concert, Komiyama was announced for her fourth senbatsu in AKB48's 51st single, to be released on March 14, 2018.

On April 17, 2018, Komiyama was a Shonichi member for the Makino Anna produced stage "Yabai yo! Tsuite Koren no Ka?!". Started Komiyama Team K "RESET" stage July 6th, 2018.

Ranked 52nd in the 10th annual General Election, maintaining her position from last year. 

Komiyama participated in the stage play for the AKB48 drama "Majimuri Gakuen" as a guest on October 22.

On January 14, 2019, Komiyama appeared for the annual coming of age ceremony with other AKB48 members who will, or have turned 20. She had turned 20 the previous year but was unable to participate due to the cut off date April 2nd.

Participated in the stage play "Yama Inu" as a special guest February 27th 2019.

Participated in the stage play "Jinginakitatakai ~ kanojo (on'na)-tachi no shitō-hen ~(仁義なき戦い～彼女(おんな)たちの死闘篇～)" as additional cast.

Joined the LARME auditions in 2020 to become a LARME OFFICIAL GIRL with a one year contract for first place, she ranked 3rd place and will occasionally model for the magazine.  She also modeled for LARME's new adult style magazine PECHE in their first issue. She appears in the September issue and January 2021 issue of LARME, as well as the January 2021 issue of PECHE.

Discography

Singles with AKB48

Albums with AKB48 
Tsugi no Ashiato
 Chireba ii no ni...
Koko ga Rhodes da, Koko de Tobe!
 Bokutachi no Ideology
 Namida wa Ato Mawashi
0 to 1 no Aida
 Nakigoto Time
Thumbnail
 Ano Hi no Jibun
 Hibiwareta Kagami
Bokutachi wa, Ano Hi no Yoake wo Shitteiru 
 Renai Mukenjigoku

Appearances

Units 
Jankenmin
 Sakasazaka

Stage Units 
AKB48 Kenkyuusei Stage "Pajama Drive"
 Pajama Drive
AKB48 Team 4 Stage "Idol no Yoake"
 Zannen Shoujo
AKB48 Team 4 Stage "Yume wo Shinaseru ni Ikanai"
 Tonari no Banana
AKB48 Special Stage "Minvera yo, Kaze wo Okosen"
 Koppu no Naka no Komorebi
AKB48 Special Stage "Thumbnail"
 Baguette

Concert Units 
AKB48 Group Kenkyuusei Concert ~Oshimen Hayai Mono Gachi~
 Heart Gata Virus
AKB48 8th Anniversary
 Kimi no Hitomi wa Planetarium
AKB48 2013 Kouhaku Uta Gassen
 Akagumi Diamond
AKB48 Request Hour Setlist Best 200 2014
 Candy
Unit Matsuri 2014
 Kimi Dake ni Chu! Chu! Chu!
AKB48 Zenkoku Tour
 Avocado Janeshi
 Suki! Suki! Skip!
AKB48 9th Anniversary
 Baby! Baby! Baby!
AKB48 2014 Kouhaku Uta Gassen
 Sailor Zombie
Kojimatsuri ~Kojima Haruna Kanshasa~
 Kimi no Koto ga Suki Dakara
 Yobisute Fantasy

TV Variety 
 AKBingo! (2014 - )

Educational Shows 
 NHK Koukou Kouza

TV Dramas 

 Kyabasuka Gakuen

Web Dramas 

 Crow's Blood(Brief Cameo as Unidentified Student)

References 

1998 births
Living people
Japanese female models
AKB48 members